Motherwell South East and Ravenscraig is one of the twenty-one wards used to elect members of the North Lanarkshire Council. It elects four councillors and covers much of the town of Motherwell (roughly all the territory east of the Argyle Line railway up to the station including the town centre, Airbles, Muirhouse and the developing suburb of Ravenscraig), as well as Craigneuk and Wishawhill in Wishaw, with a population of 18,497 in 2019; created in 2007, its boundaries remained unchanged in a 2017 national review.

Councillors

Election Results

2022 Election

2017 Election
2017 North Lanarkshire Council election

2012 Election
2012 North Lanarkshire Council election

Labour councillor Gary O'Rorke resigned from the party and became Independent on 21 November 2016.

2007 Election
2007 North Lanarkshire Council election

References

Wards of North Lanarkshire
Motherwell
Wishaw